The 2010 Serbia Open (also known as Serbia Open powered by Telekom Srbija for sponsorship reasons) was a men's tennis tournament played on outdoor clay courts. It was the 2nd edition of the event. It was part of the ATP World Tour 250 series of the 2010 ATP World Tour. It took place at the Milan Gale Muškatirović complex in Belgrade, Serbia, from 3 May through 9 May 2010.

The singles draw featured the tournament's host, ATP ranked No. 2 and defending champion Novak Djokovic. Other featured stars were 2010 Grand Prix Hassan II champion Stan Wawrinka, 2010 Regions Morgan Keegan Championships champion Sam Querrey and 2010 Heineken Open champion John Isner. Third-seeded Isner won the singles title.

Entrants

Seeds

 Seedings are based on the rankings of April 26, 2010.

Other entrants
The following players received wildcards into the main draw:
  Marko Djokovic
  Filip Krajinović
  Dušan Lajović

The following players received entry from the qualifying draw:
  Flavio Cipolla
  Alessio di Mauro
  Evgeny Donskoy
  Franko Škugor

Finals

Singles

 Sam Querrey defeated  John Isner, 3–6, 7–6(7–4), 6-4
 It was Querrey's 2nd title of the year and 4th of his career

Doubles

 Santiago González /  Travis Rettenmaier defeated  Tomasz Bednarek /  Mateusz Kowalczyk, 7–6(8–6), 6–1

External links
 Official website 

Serbia
Serbia Open
2010 in Serbian sport
May 2010 sports events in Europe